Van Air Europe is a Czech passenger and cargo charter airline headquartered in Brno and based at Brno–Tuřany Airport.

History
The airline was founded in 2004 by its parent company Aeroservis.

On 15 July 2006, the airline began operating flights on behalf of Citywing, operating flights out of Blackpool, the Isle of Man, Gloucester, Belfast City, Leeds/Bradford, Newcastle upon Tyne and Jersey, the Jersey service only operating during the summer months. The Leeds service has been discontinued. Until 6 May 2013, it also operated a Shoreham - Paris-Pontoise service on behalf of Brighton City Airways. A new service to Glasgow was inaugurated in March 2014.

On 23 February 2017, a Van Air Europe Let L410 (OK-LAZ), departed Ronaldsway Airport, Isle of Man operating a scheduled service on behalf of Citywing (schedule V9-502) to Belfast City Airport. During the latter stages of the aircraft's approach to Runway 04 at Belfast City the approach was discontinued as a consequence of adverse weather. An appraisal of the weather at both Belfast City and Belfast Aldergrove airports resulted in the crew diverting the aircraft back to the Isle of Man, touching down at Ronaldsway at 09:25hrs (GMT). After landing the aircraft was instructed to stop by local Air Traffic Control, and the emergency services were requested. Passengers disembarked the aircraft without injury.

On 23 February 2017, the UK Civil Aviation Authority (CAA) revealed it has suspended Van Air's permission to fly in the United Kingdom. Following the response to Safety Recommendation 2018-005 made on 1 March 2018, the case was closed by the Air Accidents Investigation Branch (AAIB).

Fleet

As of November 2021, the Van Air Europe fleet consists of the following aircraft:

References

External links

Official website

Airlines established in 2004
Airlines of the Czech Republic
Companies based in Brno
Czech companies established in 2004